Bonus points are group tournament points awarded in rugby union tournaments in addition to the standard points for winning or drawing a match. Bonus points were implemented in order to encourage attacking play throughout a match, to discourage repetitive goal-kicking, and to reward teams for "coming close" in losing efforts.

Standard system
The most common point system is:

 4 points for winning a match
 2 points for drawing a match
 0 points for losing a match
 1 losing bonus point for losing by 7 points (or fewer)
 1 try bonus point for scoring (at least) 4 tries, regardless of the outcome.

In this system, winning teams get 4 or 5 points; drawing teams 2 or 3 points; and losing teams between 0 and 2 points:

Variant systems

France
The French professional league, Ligue Nationale de Rugby (LNR), uses a similar system in its two competitions, the Top 14 and Rugby Pro D2. After trialling the system in 2007–08, LNR adopted the new system permanently after that season.

The French system awards points in this manner:
4 points for a win.
2 points for a draw.
1 "bonus" point for winning while scoring at least 3 more tries than the opponent.
1 "bonus" point for losing by no more than a specified margin. Through the 2013–14 season, the margin was 7 points; starting in 2014–15, the margin was reduced to 5.

This system prevents a losing team from picking up two bonus points in the same match, as is possible under the normal system. It also means that neither team earns a bonus point in a drawn match.

Australian NRC (2014–2016)

For its first three seasons from 2014 to 2016, the National Rugby Championship of Australia used a system somewhat similar to that of France:
4 points for a win.
2 points for a draw.
1 "bonus" point for winning while scoring at least 3 more tries than the opponent.
1 "bonus" point for losing by no more than 8 points (the value of a converted try under the law variations used during those seasons).

In 2017 the NRC (including a team in Fiji) reverted to the standard scoring values of five points for a try, two for a conversion and three for a penalty or drop goal. The bonus point system therefore fell into line with the SANZAAR system widely adopted in that year.

SANZAAR
In 2016, Super Rugby in the SANZAAR countries of Argentina, Australia, New Zealand and South Africa, also with a team in Japan, switched from the standard system to the original French system, i.e.
4 points for a win.
2 points for a draw.
1 "bonus" point for scoring at least 3 more tries than the opponent.
1 "bonus" point for losing by no more than 7 points (the value of a converted try).

SANZAAR extended this change to The Rugby Championship, contested by the men's national teams of its four member countries, in 2017.

Six Nations
The 2017 Six Nations Championship used the standard bonus points system on a trial basis, with the added feature that a team winning the Grand Slam would earn three extra bonus points to ensure that a grand slam winning team is guaranteed to win the tournament. Six Nations tournaments also award a bonus point to any team that scores four tries or more, regardless of the outcome, meaning that a losing team can score up to two points if they score four tries and lose by seven points or less.

Tables
Bonus points are typically listed in the group standings table, as for example the BP column in 2015 Rugby World Cup Pool B:

More detailed tables may list losing-bonus points and tries-bonus points separately, as respectively the  LB and TB columns in the 2015–16 European Rugby Champions Cup Pool 2 table:

Details

This format was created for New Zealand's domestic competition, the National Provincial Championship, in 1995 and subsequently adopted in the inaugural Super 12 in 1996. It was first used at the Rugby World Cup in 2003, and has been the staple for international and club competition since.

Other forms of rugby

Rugby sevens, while still under the rugby union banner, does not use this system, and instead gives points for wins and draws. Sevens is a faster, more try-friendly game with a shorter time limit and a tendency to have runaway results. Sevens competitions are also usually one or two day affairs with an emphasis on the final bracket. All of this means there is little reason in using the bonus point system for the seven-a-side game.

Rugby league has tried out similar bonus point systems in some competitions, but most competitions only give points for wins and draws. However, from 2007 season through to 2014, the Championship and League 1 (the two levels below Super League), primarily in England but also featuring teams in France and Wales during this time frame, gave 3 points for a win, 2 for a draw, and 1 for a loss by 12 points or fewer (this amounts to two converted tries in rugby league, which gives four points for a try instead of the five points awarded in union). This changed in the 2015 season when the points system was brought into line with that of Super League, thereby standardising the system across Britain's three professional Rugby League divisions, abandoning the bonus points system.

Notes and references

Bonus points